The 11th Vietnam Film Festival was held from November 28 to November 30, 1996, in Hanoi, Vietnam, with the slogan: "For an advanced Vietnam cinema imbued with national identity" (Vietnamese: "Vì một nền điện ảnh Việt Nam tiên tiến đậm đà bản sắc dân tộc").

Event 
There were 129 films in attendance at the Film Festival. The jury has awarded only two Golden Lotuses for documentary and science films and vacated the Golden Lotus in both feature films and animated films.

However, this is the first time that the Vietnam Film Festival has found a Golden Lotus for a direct-to-video feature film, which is "Giữa dòng" - a film produced by Ho Chi Minh City Television. This incident marked the decline of the commercial direct-to-video film and the rise of television film.

The film "Thương nhớ đồng quê" by director Đặng Nhật Minh was not supported by the press before attending the film festival even though it was a good film. These articles invisibly influenced the judges, causing them to find other solutions. In the end, instead of awarding the film, they decided to give it the Best Director award.

Awards

Feature film

Direct-to-video

Documentary/Science film

Animated film

Notes

References 

Vietnam Film Festival
Vietnam Film Festival
1996 in Vietnam